USS England has been the name of two ships in the United States Navy.  Both were named for Ensign John C. England.

  was commissioned in 1943 and decommissioned in 1945. She is best known for finding and destroying 6 Japanese submarines in 12 days during May 1944.
 /(CG-22) was a guided missile cruiser, was commissioned on 7 December 1963, and decommissioned on 21 January 1994.

United States Navy ship names